The 1988–89 Iraq FA Cup was the 12th edition of the Iraq FA Cup as a clubs-only competition. The tournament was won by Al-Zawraa for the fifth time, beating Al-Tayaran (now known as Al-Quwa Al-Jawiya) 3–0 in the final. The first two rounds were between teams from the lower divisions, before the top-flight clubs entered at the round of 32.

Bracket

First preliminary round

Second preliminary round

Final phase

Matches

Final

References

External links
 Iraqi Football Website

Iraq FA Cup
Cup